Below is a list of official residences of India.

Union

State

Union territories

See also
 Raj Bhavan
 Raj Niwas

References

 
India
Residences